Kewdale Freight Terminal is a large intermodal rail facility in the Perth suburb of Kewdale, Western Australia. Branching off the Kwinana freight railway, it was built in the 1960s to replace the Perth marshalling yard. It initially comprised ten narrow gauge (1067mm) and seven standard gauge (1435mm) arrival roads.

The first narrow gauge sidings opened in early 1967; the first standard gauge sidings in November 1968.

Users
Pacific National yard and depot
UGL Rail to service the carriages used on the Indian Pacific
Transwa depot opened April 2005 to service WDA/WDB/WDC class railcars used on AvonLink and Prospector services
BP fuel siding
Sadliers Transport siding
Country Carriers siding
BlueScope yard, moved to new facility in Forrestfield late 2005

Redevelopment plans

All rail freight in and out of this terminal is moved on a single standard gauge track that crosses Daddow Road, and this level crossing has become a congestion headache for road users in the industrial area.  In November 2005 the Federal Government announced it had allocated $11.5 million for the construction of an overpass at the level crossing. Now it is completed.

Rail operators Aurizon, Pacific National and Transwa share common sections of the yard which can also lead to congestion. Apart from the departure road, the yard is unsignalled. Track occupation of the common sections - north service road, eastern diagonal, and western diagonal - is manually managed by radio communications with Arc Infrastructure Eastern Train Control.

References

Economy of Perth, Western Australia
Rail infrastructure in Western Australia
Rail yards in Australia
Railway freight terminals in Australia
Transport infrastructure completed in 1968
1967 establishments in Australia